Living on the Veg is a British vegan cookery programme that first aired in 2020 on ITV. It is hosted by the cookery writers and bloggers Henry Firth and Ian Theasby, a duo known as BOSH!. Each episode features a series of recipes cooked by Firth and Theasby, and a guest who talks with the hosts about food and their work. It is produced by produced by Rock Oyster Media and distributed by Cineflix Rights. Living on the Veg is ITV's first vegan cooking programme.

Production
Firth and Theasby met at High Storrs School in Sheffield as children and became friends. The pair became vegan in 2015; Theasby first, with Firth following after seeing Cowspiracy. They then formed BOSH!, producing vegan cookery videos for YouTube and social media, garnering over a billion views. They authored a series of successful cookery books, as well as How to Live Vegan, a book about living as a vegan in a non-vegan world. As early as 2017, Firth and Theasby hoped to host the first vegan cookery show.

They pitched the idea to a range of production companies, but had no initial success. They were then approached by Plymouth-based production company Rock Oyster Media, who asked if the pair had considered producing a vegan cookery programme.

In producing Living on the Veg, Firth and Theasby hoped to appeal beyond the vegan market, to flexitarian and even meat-eating audiences.

The first episode, which was aired on 12 January 2020, featured sponsorship from the supermarket Waitrose, along with ITV's other Sunday morning cookery programming. This led to a backlash from vegans, as the Waitrose adverts featured non-vegan products and footage of farmed animals. Spokespersons from The Vegan Society and PETA argued that Waitrose could have used the adverts to showcase their plant-based products. Waitrose apologised, explaining that they were not aware of the content of Living on the Veg in advance, and explained that they were speaking to ITV to "make sure that all foods featured in the future are more matched to the topics in the show".

Format
The first series was made up of ten one-hour episodes, airing weekly on Sunday mornings. On the programme, Firth and Theasby produce a series of vegan foods, for a range of meals, including "pizzas, burgers, curries, pies, big breakfasts, [and] decadent desserts". They aim to walk viewers "through a new weekly menu every episode". Every episode features a guest. The tone is light-hearted, featuring back-and-forth between Firth and Theasby.

Episodes

See also
 List of vegan media

References

External links
BOSH! official site
Life on the Veg on ITV

British cooking television shows
2020 British television series debuts
2020 British television series endings
Plant-based diets